Javad Saeed was an Iranian politician who served as the last Speaker of the Parliament of Iran during Pahlavi dynasty, and was the last secretary-general of the ruling Resurgence Party. He represented Sari in the parliament. He resigned from the post of secretary-general of the Resurgence Party on 2 October 1978.

Saeed was appointed as a member of the Regency Council in 1979 and following the revolution, he was arrested and faced seven charges in the Islamic Revolutionary Court, including corruption on earth, war on God and on prophet, insulting the religion, massacre of innocent people, physical torture and procuring; eventually leading to his execution.

References

External links

20th-century Iranian politicians
1920s births
1979 deaths
Iran Novin Party politicians
Members of the 22nd Iranian Majlis
Members of the 23rd Iranian Majlis
Members of the 24th Iranian Majlis
People from Sari, Iran
People executed by Iran by firing squad
Politicians executed during the Iranian Revolution
Rastakhiz Party Secretaries-General
Speakers of the National Consultative Assembly